In mathematics, an aliquot sequence is a sequence of positive integers in which each term is the sum of the proper divisors of the previous term. If the sequence reaches the number 1, it ends, since the sum of the proper divisors of 1 is 0.

Definition and overview
The aliquot sequence starting with a positive integer k can be defined formally in terms of the sum-of-divisors function σ1 or the aliquot sum function s in the following way:
 s0 = k
 sn = s(sn−1) = σ1(sn−1) − sn−1 if sn−1 > 0
 sn = 0 if sn−1 = 0 ---> (if we add this condition, then the terms after 0 are all 0, and all aliquot sequences would be infinite sequence, and we can conjecture that all aliquot sequences are convergent, the limit of these sequences are usually 0 or 6)
and s(0) is undefined.

For example, the aliquot sequence of 10 is 10, 8, 7, 1, 0 because:

σ1(10) − 10 = 5 + 2 + 1 = 8,
σ1(8) − 8 = 4 + 2 + 1 = 7,
σ1(7) − 7 = 1,
σ1(1) − 1 = 0.

Many aliquot sequences terminate at zero; all such sequences necessarily end with a prime number followed by 1 (since the only proper divisor of a prime is 1), followed by 0 (since 1 has no proper divisors). See  for a list of such numbers up to 75. There are a variety of ways in which an aliquot sequence might not terminate:
 A perfect number has a repeating aliquot sequence of period 1. The aliquot sequence of 6, for example, is 6, 6, 6, 6, ...
 An amicable number has a repeating aliquot sequence of period 2. For instance, the aliquot sequence of 220 is 220, 284, 220, 284, ...
 A sociable number has a repeating aliquot sequence of period 3 or greater. (Sometimes the term sociable number is used to encompass amicable numbers as well.) For instance, the aliquot sequence of 1264460 is 1264460, 1547860, 1727636, 1305184, 1264460, ...
 Some numbers have an aliquot sequence which is eventually periodic, but the number itself is not perfect, amicable, or sociable. For instance, the aliquot sequence of 95 is 95, 25, 6, 6, 6, 6, ... . Numbers like 95 that are not perfect, but have an eventually repeating aliquot sequence of period 1 are called aspiring numbers.

The lengths of the aliquot sequences that start at n are
1, 2, 2, 3, 2, 1, 2, 3, 4, 4, 2, 7, 2, 5, 5, 6, 2, 4, 2, 7, 3, 6, 2, 5, 1, 7, 3, 1, 2, 15, 2, 3, 6, 8, 3, 4, 2, 7, 3, 4, 2, 14, 2, 5, 7, 8, 2, 6, 4, 3, ... 

The final terms (excluding 1) of the aliquot sequences that start at n are
1, 2, 3, 3, 5, 6, 7, 7, 3, 7, 11, 3, 13, 7, 3, 3, 17, 11, 19, 7, 11, 7, 23, 17, 6, 3, 13, 28, 29, 3, 31, 31, 3, 7, 13, 17, 37, 7, 17, 43, 41, 3, 43, 43, 3, 3, 47, 41, 7, 43, ... 

Numbers whose aliquot sequence terminates in 1 are
1, 2, 3, 4, 5, 7, 8, 9, 10, 11, 12, 13, 14, 15, 16, 17, 18, 19, 20, 21, 22, 23, 24, 26, 27, 29, 30, 31, 32, 33, 34, 35, 36, 37, 38, 39, 40, 41, 42, 43, 44, 45, 46, 47, 48, 49, 50, ... 

Numbers whose aliquot sequence known to terminate in a perfect number, other than perfect numbers themselves (6, 28, 496, ...), are 
25, 95, 119, 143, 417, 445, 565, 608, 650, 652, 675, 685, 783, 790, 909, 913, ... 

Numbers whose aliquot sequence terminates in a cycle with length at least 2 are
220, 284, 562, 1064, 1184, 1188, 1210, 1308, 1336, 1380, 1420, 1490, 1604, 1690, 1692, 1772, 1816, 1898, 2008, 2122, 2152, 2172, 2362, ... 

Numbers whose aliquot sequence is not known to be finite or eventually periodic are
276, 306, 396, 552, 564, 660, 696, 780, 828, 888, 966, 996, 1074, 1086, 1098, 1104, 1134, 1218, 1302, 1314, 1320, 1338, 1350, 1356, 1392, 1398, 1410, 1464, 1476, 1488, ... 

A number that is never the successor in an aliquot sequence is called an untouchable number.
2, 5, 52, 88, 96, 120, 124, 146, 162, 188, 206, 210, 216, 238, 246, 248, 262, 268, 276, 288, 290, 292, 304, 306, 322, 324, 326, 336, 342, 372, 406, 408, 426, 430, 448, 472, 474, 498, ...

Catalan–Dickson conjecture 
An important conjecture due to Catalan, sometimes called the Catalan–Dickson conjecture, is that every aliquot sequence ends in one of the above ways: with a prime number, a perfect number, or a set of amicable or sociable numbers. The alternative would be that a number exists whose aliquot sequence is infinite yet never repeats. Any one of the many numbers whose aliquot sequences have not been fully determined might be such a number. The first five candidate numbers are often called the Lehmer five (named after D.H. Lehmer): 276, 552, 564, 660, and 966. However, it is worth noting that 276 may reach a high apex in its aliquot sequence and then descend; the number 138 reaches a peak of 179931895322 before returning to 1.

Guy and Selfridge believe the Catalan–Dickson conjecture is false (so they conjecture some aliquot sequences are unbounded above (i.e., diverge)).

, there were 898 positive integers less than 100,000 whose aliquot sequences have not been fully determined, and 9190 such integers less than 1,000,000.

Systematically searching for aliquot sequences 

Cycles in  represent sociable numbers within the interval . Two special cases are loops that represent perfect numbers and cycles of length two that represent amicable pairs.

See also 
 Arithmetic dynamics

Notes

References 

 Manuel Benito; Wolfgang Creyaufmüller; Juan Luis Varona; Paul Zimmermann. Aliquot Sequence 3630 Ends After Reaching 100 Digits. Experimental Mathematics, vol. 11, num. 2, Natick, MA, 2002, p. 201–206.
 W. Creyaufmüller. Primzahlfamilien - Das Catalan'sche Problem und die Familien der Primzahlen im Bereich 1 bis 3000 im Detail. Stuttgart 2000 (3rd ed.), 327p.

External links
Current status of aliquot sequences with start term below 2 million
Tables of Aliquot Cycles (J.O.M. Pedersen)
Aliquot Page (Wolfgang Creyaufmüller)
Aliquot sequences (Christophe Clavier)
Forum on calculating aliquot sequences (MersenneForum)
Aliquot sequence summary page for sequences up to 100000 (there are similar pages for higher ranges) (Karsten Bonath)
Active research site on aliquot sequences (Jean-Luc Garambois) 

Arithmetic functions
Divisor function
Arithmetic dynamics